Trussardi is an Italian fashion house, founded in 1911.

Trussardi may also refer to:
 Trussardi (surname)

See also
Nicola Trussardi Foundation, a non-profit institution for the promotion of contemporary art and culture
Tusari